Yordanka Yankova (born 26 July 1949) is a Bulgarian sprinter. She competed in the women's 4 × 100 metres relay at the 1972 Summer Olympics.

References

External links
 

1949 births
Living people
Athletes (track and field) at the 1972 Summer Olympics
Bulgarian female sprinters
Olympic athletes of Bulgaria
Place of birth missing (living people)
Olympic female sprinters